Shotesham is a village in South Norfolk which lies approximately 5 miles south of Norwich. It sits next to Stoke Holy Cross and Saxlingham Nethergate in the valley of the River Tas.

Shotesham was for many years the Norfolk seat of the D'Oyly family and of the D'Oyly baronets 'of Shottisham', Norfolk (not to be confused with Shottisham, Suffolk), who also possessed estates in Suffolk. The country house and estate of Shotesham Park, designed by Sir John Soane is the seat of the Fellowes family.

Churches
Four churches were once to be found here, two are intact and two are ruins:

All Saints
The present parish church, stand in the centre of the village, and is from two distinct periods, the medieval tower and nave, with a chancel from the early 20th century.

St.Mary's
Much more remote on the other side of the valley from All Saints about a mile away is this lovely church, sitting next to a large farmhouse, and the ruin of St.Martins you could forgive it for being redundant, but the parish keep it in use with a service every month, a wonderful mixture of brick and flint, it retains its ancient feel despite a large Victorian restoration.

St.Martin's
Standing in the shadow of St.Mary's, the church has been a ruin for centuries, and until recently it was ivy clad from top to bottom, but a recent grant was handed out to remove the vegetation and consolidate the remains, the impressive, unbuttressed tower now rises above the site of its old churchyard to accompany the tower of St. Mary's beyond.
The narrow nave and chancel survive to mostly head height, leading away to the well preserved east gable, there are also the remains of the south porch.

St.Botolph's
The fourth church is to be found about half a mile north of St Mary's and St Martin's, its site given away by the name Church Farm. On the north side of the fork in the Hawes Green and Hollow Lanes is a bumpy paddock, the former churchyard, and a small section of flint survives, the base of the west wall of the tower, complete with the first courses of the buttresses. This was all very difficult to see as in recent years the whole copse was completely overgrown, but due to the efforts of the parish council and the Shotesham Gardening and Conservation group, the area has been cleared and replanted and the ruin consolidated for public viewing. For the first time in centuries, the former graveyard has a welcoming sign and gate. It is thought to have been lost as part of a dispute between Henry VIII and the Abbot of St Benet, who held the living of the church, and St Martin's.

Notes

External links
Shotesham Village Website

 
Villages in Norfolk
Civil parishes in Norfolk